Amos Lawrence (April 22, 1786 – December 31, 1852) was an American merchant and philanthropist.

Biography
Amos Lawrence was born in Groton, Massachusetts. Lawrence attended elementary school in Groton and briefly attended the Groton Academy. In 1799, at age 13, Amos Lawrence became a clerk at a country store in Dunstable, Massachusetts, and a few months afterward was promoted to a variety store in Groton. After the completion of his apprenticeship, in April 1807, Amos went to Boston with $20 of his savings.  His employers' business there failed.  Amos was appointed by the creditors to settle the firm's accounts, and after doing that to their satisfaction he rented a shop on Cornhill and founded a dry-goods establishment on his own account in December. In 1808, his brother Abbott entered his employ as chief clerk, and in 1814 became a partner in the firm, now called A. & A. Lawrence and later A. & A. Lawrence and Co.  The firm continued until Amos's death and became the greatest wholesale mercantile house in the United States. It was successful even in the hard times of 1812 to 1815, and afterwards engaged particularly in selling woolen and cotton goods on commission. In 1818, A. & A. Lawrence purchased 50 shares of the Suffolk Bank, a clearinghouse bank on State Street in Boston.

The firm did much for the establishment of the cotton textile industry in New England. In 1830, it came to the aid of financially distressed mills of Lowell, Massachusetts. In that year, the Suffolk, Tremont and Lawrence companies were established in Lowell, and Luther Lawrence, the eldest brother, represented the firm's interests there.  In 1845–1847, the firm established and built up Lawrence, Massachusetts, named in honor of Abbott Lawrence, who was a director of the Essex Company, which controlled the water power of Lawrence, and afterwards was president of the Atlantic Cotton Mills and Pacific Mills there.

In 1831 when his health failed, Amos Lawrence retired from active involvement in the firm, where thereafter Abbott Lawrence was the head.  The later years of Amos's life were spent mostly in furthering various philanthropic enterprises. According to his records, from 1829 until his death, Amos Lawrence gave over $639,000 (in 1840s dollars) to charitable causes.  In 1842, he decided not to allow his property to increase any further, and in the last eleven years of his life he spent in charity at least $525,000.  To Williams College, he gave nearly $40,000; to Groton Academy, which later changed its name to Lawrence Academy to honor both Amos and his brother, William, he gave over $20,000; to Wabash College, Kenyon College, and the theological seminary at Bangor, Maine, he also gave sizable sums.

His private donations were numerous, requiring several rooms in his house to coordinate them. Among other things, Amos Lawrence donated libraries to academic institutions, established a children's hospital in Boston, and gave $10,000 for the completion of the Bunker Hill Monument (Lawrence's father had fought at the Battle of Bunker Hill). He gave to many good causes on a smaller scale, taking especial delight in occasionally giving books from a bundle in his sleigh or carriage as he drove.

Upon his death in 1852 in Boston, his fortune was estimated at $8,100,000—roughly $ in today's dollars.

Family
Lawrence was the fourth son of Samuel Lawrence and Susanna (née Parker) Lawrence. Samuel Lawrence was a Revolutionary War officer and one of the founders of Groton Academy (now Lawrence Academy at Groton), where Amos was educated. Samuel was in turn descended from John Lawrence of Wissett in Suffolk, England, who was one of the first settlers of Groton. Among Amos Lawrence's brothers were Luther Lawrence and Abbott Lawrence. The family firm, with Abbott Lawrence at its head, founded Lawrence, Massachusetts.

On June 6, 1811, Lawrence married Sarah Richards. They had three children, including Amos A. Lawrence. After Richards died in 1819, Amos Lawrence married Nancy Means Ellis, widow of former U.S. Representative for New Hampshire and New Hampshire Superior Court justice Caleb Ellis, on April 11, 1821. Lawrence had two more children from his second marriage.

Amos A. Lawrence was the founder of Lawrence, Kansas (thus its name) through his work with the New England Emigrant Aid Company, founded the University of Kansas, and also helped found Lawrence University in Appleton, Wisconsin. His son, Bishop William Lawrence, was the longtime Episcopal bishop of Massachusetts.

Jane Pierce, who served as First Lady during the presidency of her husband, Franklin Pierce, from 1853 to 1857, was Lawrence’s niece.

References

  This source gives his fortune as $1,000,000 at his death.

Further reading

External links
 
 

1786 births
1852 deaths
Businesspeople from Massachusetts
Philanthropists from Massachusetts
19th-century American people
People from Groton, Massachusetts
19th-century American philanthropists
19th-century American businesspeople
American people of English descent